Borislav Damyanov (born 11 April 1998) is a Bulgarian footballer who plays as a winger for Bulgarian Second League club Montana.

Career
Damyanov started his career in the youth ranks of his hometown club Montana. In January 2016, he joined the first team.  On 28 May 2016, he made his professional debut in a 1–3 away loss against Slavia Sofia, coming on as substitute for Ivan Kokonov.

Career statistics

References

External links

Living people
1998 births
Bulgarian footballers
FC Montana players
FC Kariana Erden players
First Professional Football League (Bulgaria) players
People from Montana, Bulgaria
Association football midfielders